Farquhar Matheson was a Scottish minister, who served as Moderator of the General Assembly of the Free Church of Scotland in 1939.

Life

In 1920 he became minister of the Free Church in Assynt.

Soon after he was translated to Stoer. In 1939 he succeeded Rev John MacKay MacLennan as Moderator of the General Assembly.

Family

He was father-in-law to Donald Lamont moderator in the 1970s, and maternal grandfather of Derek Lamont Moderator in 2017.

References

20th-century Ministers of the Free Church of Scotland